Gistola is a peak in the central part of the Greater Caucasus Mountain Range on Georgia–Russia border. The mountain is made up of paleozoic granites. The slopes of Gistola are covered with ice.

See also
Adishi Glacier

References

Sources
 Georgian State (Soviet) Encyclopedia. 1978. Book 3. p. 172.

Mountains of Georgia (country)
Svaneti
Four-thousanders of the Caucasus